Francisco Mesa is an electrical engineer at the University of Seville, Spain. He was named a Fellow of the Institute of Electrical and Electronics Engineers (IEEE) in 2014 for his contributions to the theory and computation of wave propagation in microwave planar structures.

References 

Fellow Members of the IEEE
Living people
Academic staff of the University of Seville
21st-century American engineers
Year of birth missing (living people)
Place of birth missing (living people)